The 2012–13 KHL season was the fifth season of the Kontinental Hockey League. The regular season began on 4 September with the Lokomotiv Cup between last year's finalists Dynamo Moscow and Avangard Omsk. For the first time, the league consisted of 26 teams from 7 countries. Dynamo Moscow successfully defended their title after beating Traktor Chelyabinsk in the Gagarin Cup finals.

Changes

Team changes
After withdrawing from the previous season in the wake of the 2011 Lokomotiv Yaroslavl plane crash that killed the team's entire active roster, Lokomotiv Yaroslavl returned to the KHL with new players.

Lev Poprad was disbanded, but a team of the same name, Lev Prague, was established in Prague, Czech Republic, while Slovan Bratislava joined the KHL and thus continues the league's presence in Slovakia. Also HC Donbass from Donetsk, Ukraine joined the league. The team previously played in the VHL. This brought the total number of teams to 26, representing 7 countries.

Salary cap
The salary cap changed from a soft cap to a hard cap, set at 1.1 billion rubles (approx. US$36.5 million), but each club can waive the cap for one player transferred directly from the NHL, if he is eligible to play for the Russian national team.

Season structure
The regular season consisted of 52 games for each team — twice (home and away) against each other team in the league and two extra games against a selected "rival" opponent (typically a geographically close team). This was a change from previous seasons, where all intra-division opponents were played more frequently. The top 8 teams from each conference qualified for the play-offs, which are played as best-of-seven series in each round.

Nadezhda Cup tournament
In January 2013, a new repechage tournament known as the Nadezhda Cup (Cup of Hope) was announced, which was held alongside the playoffs. Six teams from the Western Conference and four teams from the Eastern Conference who had not qualified for the playoffs competed in the tournament, whose prize includes the first overall pick in the next KHL Junior Draft. The new tournament was intended to extend the season, and help maintain interest in hockey for fans and players in preparation for the 2014 Winter Olympics. The first Cup of Hope was won by Dinamo Riga.

Regular season
The regular season started on 4 September 2012 with the Lokomotiv Cup between the finalists of the previous season, Dynamo Moscow and Avangard Omsk and ended on 17 February 2013 after every team has played 52 matches.

Notable events

NHL lockout
The league set up rules for the NHL lockout which lasted 16 September 2012 to early January 2013. According to the special regulations, each KHL team was allowed to add up to 3 NHL players to their roster, among them at most one foreign player.

Proposed matches in New York
Two regular season games between Dynamo Moscow and SKA Saint Petersburg were planned to take place at the new Barclays Center in Brooklyn, New York in January 2013. However, the KHL reverted this decision in October 2012 and thus these matches were played in Russia.

All-star game
The 5th KHL all-star game was played on 13 January 2013 in Chelyabinsk, with Team East, captained by Aleksey Morozov, winning 18–11 over Team West, captained by Ilya Kovalchuk.

League standings

Source: KHL.ru

Points are awarded as follows:
3 Points for a win in regulation ("W")
2 Points for a win in overtime ("OTW") or a penalty shootout ("SOW")
1 Point for a loss in overtime ("OTL") or a penalty shootout ("SOL")
0 Points for a loss in regulation ("L")

The conference standings determine the seedings for the play-offs. The first two places in each conference are reserved for the division winners.

Western Conference

y – Won division; c – Won Continental Cup  (best record in KHL);
BOB – Bobrov Division, TAR – Tarasov Division

Source: khl.ru

Eastern Conference

y – Won division; z – Won conference (and division); 
CHE – Chernyshev Division, KHA – Kharlamov Division

Source: khl.ru

Player statistics

Scoring leaders
Updated on 17 February 2013. Source: khl.ru

  
GP = Games played; G = Goals; A = Assists; Pts = Points; +/– = Plus-minus; PIM = Penalty minutes

Leading goaltenders
Updated on 17 February 2013. Source: khl.ru

GP = Games played; Min = Minutes played; W = Wins; L = Losses; SOP = Shootouts played; GA = Goals against; SO = Shutouts; SV% = Save percentage; GAA = Goals against average

Playoffs

The playoffs started on 20 February 2013 with the top eight teams from both conferences and ended on 17 April with the last game of the Gagarin Cup final.

During the first three rounds home ice was determined by seeding number within the Conference, not position on the bracket. In the Finals the team with better seeding number had home ice advantage. If the seeding numbers were equal, the regular season record was taken into account.

Player statistics

Playoff scoring leaders

  
GP = Games played; G = Goals; A = Assists; Pts = Points; +/– = Plus-minus; PIM = Penalty minutes

Playoff leading goaltenders
Updated on 17 April 2013. Source: khl.ru

GP = Games played; Min = Minutes played; W = Wins; L = Losses; SOL = Shootout losses; GA = Goals against; SO = Shutouts; SV% = Save percentage; GAA = Goals against average

Nadezhda Cup

Preliminary round
Dinamo Riga vs Torpedo Nizhny Novgorod(4–1, 3–4, Riga wins extra overtime)
Spartak Moscow vs Vityaz Chekhov (2–2, 1–0)

Final standings

Awards

Players of the Month

Best KHL players of each month.

KHL Awards
On 22 May 2013, the KHL held their annual award ceremony. A total of 23 different awards were handed out to teams, players, officials and media. The most important trophies are listed in the table below.

The league also awarded six "Golden Helmets" for the members of the all-star team:

References

 
Kontinental Hockey League seasons
1
1
1
1